Arthur Richenthal (1915 – 2007) was a lawyer who was amongst the leading attorneys for New York's large real estate players. As per The New York Times, Richenthal "won a decision by the state’s highest court that shook the cornerstone of the city’s survival plan in the fiscal crisis of the mid-1970s."

He was a Harvard Law School alumnus.

References

New York (state) lawyers
Harvard Law School alumni
1915 births
2007 deaths
20th-century American lawyers